Events from the year 1557 in Sweden

Incumbents
 Monarch – Gustav I

Events

 March - Treaty of Novgorod (1557)
 - The Duchy of Prince John is expanded.
 7 September - Duke Magnus is granted a Duchy. 
 - Crown Prince Eric are granted Kalmar as a fief and is installed there as governor.

Births

 Date unknown - Olaus Martini, archbishop  (died 1609)

Deaths

 1 August - Olaus Magnus, writer and ecclesiastic  (born 1490)
 1 April - Mikael Agricola, Protestant reformer of Finland   (born 1510)

References

 
Years of the 16th century in Sweden
Sweden